Cyrtogrammus sumatranus is a species of beetle in the family Cerambycidae. It was described by Franz in 1954. It is known from Sumatra.

References

Xylorhizini
Beetles described in 1954